Robert Hector MacQuarrie (January 10, 1935 – October 20, 2021) was a politician and teacher from Northwest Territories, Canada.

Political career
MacQuarrie was elected to the Legislative Assembly of Northwest Territories in the 1979 Northwest Territories general election. He served as Speaker of the Legislative Assembly for one year. He resigned from his post as speaker because he wanted to participate in debates in the Legislature.

MacQuarrie was re-elected in Yellowknife Centre in the 1983 Northwest Territories general election. As chairman of the Special Committee on Unity, and later as vice-chairman of the Western Constitutional Forum, he played a significant role in the division of the Northwest Territories.

References

External links
Canadian Parliamentary Review "PA Activities: The Canadian Scene" Vol 3 No 4
Canadian Parliamentary Review "Robert MacQuarrie elected speaker" Vol 3 No 1

1935 births
2021 deaths
Members of the Legislative Assembly of the Northwest Territories
People from Edson, Alberta
People from Yellowknife
Speakers of the Legislative Assembly of the Northwest Territories